This is a list of electoral results for the Electoral district of Wellington in Western Australian state elections.

Members for Wellington

Election results

Elections in the 1990s

Elections in the 1980s

Elections in the 1970s

Elections in the 1960s

Elections in the 1900s

Elections in the 1890s

References

Western Australian state electoral results by district